The Picayune Rancheria of Chukchansi Indians of California is a federally recognized tribe of indigenous people of California. They are Chukchansi or Foothills Yokuts. Picayune Rancheria is the tribe's ranchería, located in Madera County in central California.

History

The Picayune Rancheria of the Chukchansi Indians is affiliated to Chukchansi Yokuts culture.  Chukchansi Yokuts are indigenous to Central California where they have inhabited areas of the San Joaquin Valley and Sierra Nevada foothills for more than 12,000 years. In recent times, the territory of the Chukchansi population has ranged from the Sierra Nevada foothills in the East, to the Fresno and Chowchilla river valleys in Central California, down to the Tehachapi mountains in the South. Many Chukchansi still live in these foothills about 30 miles north of Fresno; the headquarters of the tribe, Picayune Rancheria, is located there today. Chukchansi is the language spoken regionally, in which anthropologists have classified an estimated 60 tribes together as Yokuts—meaning people. Hence, Chukchansi Yokuts. However, according to the official website of the Picayune Rancheria of the Chukchansi Indians, these tribes all have similar culture and customs but have had different dialects throughout history.

The first Picayunes were agents of their environment. They adapted themselves to a natural world that produced consistent harvests through the manipulation of sophisticated techniques such as farming, hunting, fishing, and gathering. Although deer and antelope were their primary source of protein, they also hunted for squirrel, rabbit, raccoons, and anything within the marshes and grasslands of their home. They would use decoys to capture or kill animals. According to Joana Blume, such decoys included the use of antlers and skin from previous kills to attract antelope. Other decoys helped catch pigeons. Blume also states that they would participate in communal drives; several members of the tribes would drive rabbits into nets. Sources of nutrition were also derived from plants that peaked in the summer: acorns, nuts, seeds, roots, and berries; these sources were gathered and reaped by certain members of the tribal communities.

Fire was more than just used for cooking. It had a multiplicative purpose to the Picayune Rancheria. Fire was used to cut hair, drive rabbits and squirrels out of their holes when hunting, and reduce grassland and vegetation that may otherwise cause greater fires. Because the brush from the grassland would be cleared by the fire, hunting and gathering were made easier as it attracted more wildlife and produced the ability to sow crops. Fire also increased the number of livable conditions within their environment. According to Blume, fires "usually occurred after harvesting seeds in the fall as well as in the spring" (15).  From such an  understanding of the environment and its resources, the Chukchansi have created an epistemology that remains important for Picayunes today.

After contact with Europeans, Spanish missionary settlers and American trappers and gold miners, the population of the indigenous Picayune were disrupted, weakened, and displaced. It is stated that prior to contact, there was a population between 70,000-80,000. According to the website, "The introduction of diseases that the Native people had no immunity to caused waves of de-population. By 1900, it is estimated that approximately 85% – 90% of all California Indians 'disappeared.' The discovery of gold in the mid-19th century brought thousands of foreigners in search of wealth. Under American rule at the time, Native people had no legal rights. Their lands were taken away from them and their way of life was changed forever."
These series of misfortunes forced the community to become laborers within the farm, logging, mining, and cowboy industries. In the early 1900s, the U.S. government began to distribute land to the landless Native Californians and created Rancherias—not reservations. This gave the tribe back their agency of autonomy; however, the relationship with the Federal government was severed between the 1950s and 60's. The sovereignty of Chukchansi tribe was denied and their land was sold.  Thankfully in 1983, the tribe was Federally recognized but they remained without land. Since then, the Picayune have struggled to buy back the land that was once stolen from them. Recently, the tribe was able to establish a casino named Chukchansi Gold Resort & Casino.

Community

The tribe is a high advocate for education. Their language is/was at the point of extinction. Since June 2009, there's been a push to work with the Department of Linguistics, California State University, Fresno to establish courses studies on the language and culture to prevent the history and culture from extinction. It is known as The Chukchansi Yokuts Revitalization Project. At one point in time, there were only 5 or 6 Native speakers who knew the language of which two were in collaboration with the university. On May 7, 2012, the tribe pledged $1 million to the department to keep its language alive.  In keeping not only its language and culture alive, the tribe has established a scholarship within Cal State Fresno known as Picayune Rancheria Chukchansi Scholarship. Currently enrolled students must demonstrate their interest in Native American culture, history and/or language within the fields of Linguistics, Anthropology, Finance, Education, or Agriculture. Besides the University, The tribe offers educational programs and services for tribal members. All highs school and adult members are assisted with educational scholarships, collegiate and academic advising, career development, and internships in collaboration with local organisations and institutions. There is also an extra-curricular activity program for grade school students (K-12). The tribe strongly believes in early education for "ensuring a promising future for children and families of Native American heritage." "Therefore, the staff at [their] school will passionately seek to ensure that all students and their families are given the tools that they need to succeed in education while at the same time giving Native American people the opportunity to relay the cultural foundation that was once taken away from many families."

Government
The tribe's headquarters is located in Coarsegold, California. They are governed by a democratically elected, seven-member tribal council. The current administration is as follows.
 Chairwoman: 
 Vice-Chairman: 
 Secretary: 
 Treasurer: 
 Member at large:
 Member at Large: 
 Member at Large:

Tribal Council is composed of seven tribe members who have been elected by their peers. Members of the Tribal Council, as well as members of its committees (Elections, TORT, Enrollment, Natural Resources, and Education), contribute a significant amount of their personal time and energy to look after the well-being of the Picayune Rancheria and the activities of the Tribe.
Meetings

All tribal members are encouraged to actively participate in the governing process by attending the Tribe's General Council meetings, which are held the fourth Monday of each month, and the Business meetings, which are held the first and third Thursday of each month. Meetings are held at 39800 Fresno Flats Rd, Oakhurst California, 93644, at the Oakhurst Community Center beginning at 6:00 pm.

Elections

Tribal Council elections are held annually. In accordance with the Constitution and Election Ordinance of the Picayune Rancheria of the Chukchansi Indians, an election committee has direct responsibility for the management of the election process.

Candidates for membership on the Tribal Council shall be qualified voters and shall reside within a 75-mile radius of the Picayune Reservation. Any tribal member 18 years or older, and who has attended at least eight tribal council meetings is eligible to run for Tribal Council. Officers of the Tribal Council shall be at least 25 years of age or older; reside within a 75-mile radius of the Reservation; have attended at least eight tribal council meetings within the past year.

Rancheria
Founded in 1912, the Picayune Rancheria is  large and located in Madera County, in Coarsegold, California. The community of Yosemite Lakes is also nearby.

Economic development
The tribe owns and operates the Chukchansi Gold Resort and Casino, California Market Buffet, Goldfield's Cafe, Noodle Bar, Vintage Steakhouse, and Bakery, all located in Coarsegold. The Casino owns the naming rights to Chukchansi Park in Fresno.

MightyOak Capital
MightyOak is a venture capital firm, merchant bank and real estate investment firm. MightyOak maintains a broad portfolio of passive investments and is the Central California leader in merger and acquisition transactions. In addition, MightyOak is an active real estate investor and developer.

Mighty Builders
Established in 1987, Mighty Builders is the leading commercial construction company in Central California, and a national leader in Indian Country construction and commercial self-storage construction. Currently licensed in California, Nevada and Hawaii; Mighty Builders has built several million square feet of commercial projects throughout the western United States.
Yosemite Lumber
Established in 1953, Yosemite Lumber is the premier wholesale distributor of lumber products and construction supplies in Central California. Located in Oakhurst, California, Yosemite works with commercial and residential contractors for all their lumber and building supplies.

Chukchansi Crossing
is located on Highway 41 at the entry to the legendary Chukchansi Gold Resort and Casino, Chukchansi Crossing is at the "halfway point" between the Fresno/Clovis Metropolitan area and Yosemite National Park. Chukchansi Crossing will include restaurants, a boutique retail and one of the most cutting-edge fuel and travel centers in the United States featuring California's widest selection of Native American fuel and products at phenomenally low prices.

Blue King Inc.
Blue King Inc. is a tribal lending entity wholly owned by the Picayune Rancheria of the Chukchansi Indians, a sovereign nation recognized by and located within the United States of America. By utilizing their website, you are conducting business on the Picayune Rancheria of the Chukchansi Indians through Blue King Inc. and are subjecting yourself exclusively to the laws and jurisdiction of the Picayune Rancheria of the Chukchansi Indians, a sovereign Native American nation.

Willow Glen Smoke Shop
Founded in 2011 by Chukchansi Inc., Willow Glen Smoke Shop is a tribally-owned Native American company that carries Native American brand tobacco and other tobacco products. Willow Glen Smoke Shop is one of the leading Native American owned tobacco retailers in California. Willow Glen Smoke Shop is open to the public and carries a variety of Native brand cigarettes and other products.

Sportsmen's Den
Is a Federal Firearms Licensee (FFL) located in Oakhurst and Mariposa, CA. Their license classifies them with the ATF as a firearms dealer. It is recommended that customers contact them at 559-683-2900 with any questions regarding buying, selling, or transferring firearms and the fees associated with those services.

FOI Commercial Interiors
In 2010, the Chukchansi Indian Tribe, located near the base of Yosemite in the mountains of California, purchased FOI to be included in their portfolio of businesses. The vision and values of FOI and the Chukchansi Tribe complement each other perfectly and the acquisition promises tremendous opportunity for growth and additional resources for their clients.

Disenrollment controversy
Since the 2003 opening of the Chukchansi Gold Resort and Casino the Chukchansi Tribe has been one of the leading tribes known for disenrolling its own members. Disenrollment is the process by which a tribe strips members of their tribal affiliation thus denying those members the benefits associated with federal tribal affiliation such as education benefits, land and property rights on reservations, tax benefits, medical benefits, and payments to the tribe from tribal sources of money including money from casinos owned by the tribe as well as child care and elder care. Since 2003 hundreds of tribal members have been disenrolled allowing the remaining tribal members to receive larger portions of the income from the casino. The tribe has disenrolled people with documented ancestry, land rights granted by the federal government and some of the last native speakers of the Chukchansi language. By 2013 the tribal membership had gone from an estimated 1800 members to an estimated 900 members. In a now thrown-out court case in 2012, the Ramirezes family argued that only the members of their family were legitimate Chukchansi tribe members.
In February 2012 leaders who opposed the policies of disenrollment were elected to the tribal council by a majority vote. However, the incumbent council members invalidated the elections and refused to step down to the newly elected leaders. This resulted in supporters of the newly elected leaders staging protest where they occupied the "City Hall" building. The supporters of the incumbents then showed up and began throwing pepper-spray and burning logs into the building the protesters were occupying. Sheriffs deputies from Fresno and Madera Counties as well as the California Highway Patrol were called to break up the resulting riots.

In February 2014 the Bureau of Indian Affairs stepped in and reappointed the 2010 Tribal Council in an attempt to temporarily resolve the dispute until a new Tribal Council was voted on. They decided to reappoint the 2010 leadership as that was the last year when the BIA could determine that there was an uncontested Tribal Council election.

Education
The ranchería is served by the Coarsegold Union Elementary School District and Yosemite Joint Union High School District.

Notes

References
 Pritzker, Barry M. A Native American Encyclopedia: History, Culture, and Peoples. Oxford: Oxford University Press, 2000. .
Aune, Doreen. Chukchansi Language Adult Curriculum. Linguistics in the College of Arts and Humanities. California State University, Fresno. Fresno, CA. 2012. 
Blume, Joanna M. Grasslands—The forgotten Resource: The Cultural Ecology Of The Central California Grasslands. Department of Anthropology and Sociology. Santa Clara University, Santa Clara, CA. 1994. 
Chukchansi Gold Casino & Resort. Web.  
California State University, Fresno. Chukchansi Yokuts Revitalization Project.  
California State University, Fresno.  
Guekguezian, Peter Ara. Topics in Chukchansi Yokuts phonology and morphology. Diss. California State University, Fresno, 2011.
Indian Country Media Network. Tribe Donates $1 Million to Preserve Chukchansi Language. 10 May 2012.  
The Official Website of the Picayune Rancheria of the Chukchansi Indians.

External links
 Picayune Rancheria of the Chukchansi Indians
 This American Life story on Picayune Ranchería Chukchansi
 "Park Service Announces Picayune Rancheria of the Chukchansi Indians to Receive $51,201 in Historic Preservation Grant Dollars for American Indian Tribes"
"Topics in Chukchansi Yokuts Phonology and Morphology

Yokuts
American Indian reservations in California
Madera County, California
Native American tribes in California
Federally recognized tribes in the United States